Eriogonum palmerianum is a species of wild buckwheat known by the common name Palmer's buckwheat. It is native to the Southwestern region of the United States and Great Basin region, where it grows in many types of desert and sagebrush plateau habitat.

Description
This is an annual herb producing an erect stem up to 30 centimeters tall which is coated in woolly fibers. The leaves are located around the base of the stem and are borne on short petioles.

The upper part of the stem spreads into an inflorescence lined with clusters of small white, yellow, or pink flowers.

External links

Jepson Manual Treatment - Eriogonum palmerianum
Eriogonum palmerianum - Photo gallery

palmerianum
Flora of the Southwestern United States
Flora of Northwestern Mexico
Flora of Nevada
Flora of the Great Basin
Flora of the California desert regions
Flora of the Sonoran Deserts
Flora without expected TNC conservation status